The 1926–27 Challenge Cup was the 27th staging of rugby league's oldest knockout competition, the Challenge Cup.

First round

Second round

Quarterfinals

Semifinals

Final
In the Challenge Cup tournament's final Oldham faced Swinton. It was the first radio broadcast of the Challenge Cup final by the BBC. Oldham won 26-7 in the final played at Wigan in front of a crowd of 33,448. This was Oldham’s fourth consecutive appearance in the final and their second win in that period.  It was their seventh overall appearance in a Challenge Cup final and their third success overall.

References

Challenge Cup
Challenge Cup